Lewis Watson, 2nd Earl of Rockingham ( – 4 December 1745) was a British peer, styled Viscount Sondes from 1722 to 1724.

He was born the eldest son of Edward Watson, Viscount Sondes and Lady Catherine Tufton, the daughter of Thomas Tufton, 6th Earl of Thanet and Lady Catherine Cavendish.

His father having predeceased his own father, Lewis inherited the earldom from his grandfather, Lewis Watson, 1st Earl of Rockingham, in 1724. He was Lord Lieutenant of Kent from 1737 to his death in 1745.

He married his first cousin Catherine, daughter of Sir Robert Furnese. As part of the marriage settlement, he purchased a London house in Grosvenor Square and had it grandly decorated with marble tables, Persian carpets, mahogany panelling, silk damask hangings, and an organ.

Watson died childless on 4 December and was buried on 14 December 1745 at Rockingham. He was succeeded by his brother, Thomas. His widow subsequently married, on 13 June 1751, as his third wife, Francis, Earl of Guildford, who died on 4 August 1790. She died on 17 December 1766 and was buried at Wroxton.

References

Sources

1714 births
1745 deaths
Earls in the Peerage of Great Britain
Lord-Lieutenants of Kent